Canal+ 3D may refer to several former 3D television channels:

 Canal+ 3D (France), owned by Canal Plus Group SA
 Canal+ 3D (Poland), owned by Canal Plus Group SA of France
 Canal+ 3D (Spain), owned by Telefónica